Imitation may refer to:
Imitation in human and animal behavior
Imitation (art), the fundamental artistic creativity doctrine which prescribes the close imitation of the masterpieces of the preceding authors
Dionysian imitatio, by Dionysius of Halicarnassus, the first formulation, in the West, of the doctrine of imitation
Mimesis, as theorized by Aristotle, the artistic imitation or representation of Nature  
Imitation (music), a form of musical repetition
Imitations (album), a 2013 album by Mark Lanegan
Imitation (film), a 2007 film directed by Frederico Hidalgo
Imitation (TV series), a 2021 South Korean television series

See also
Fake (disambiguation)
Imation, an American holding company
Imitation Game (disambiguation)
Mimicry (disambiguation)